Jamaica's fourteen parishes are subdivided into sixty-three constituencies.  The country follows the Westminster system and elects sixty-three Members of Parliament (MPs) to the Jamaica House of Representatives.

Constituencies and MPs as of 2019

The following is the list of constituencies as at April 2019, and the MP elected in each constituency.

 
Administrative divisions in North America
Jamaica
Jamaica politics-related lists